The Progressive Reform Party was a South African party that was formed on 26 July 1975 by the fusion of the Reform Party led by Harry Schwarz and Progressive Party led by Colin Eglin. Harry Schwarz predicted that the merger would lead to a "new political dimension in South Africa".

Colin Eglin was elected leader of the party While Harry Schwarz was made Chairman of the Federal Executive.

In 1977, the United Party merged with another small party to form the New Republic Party. A number of United Party members left to form the Committee for a United Opposition, which then joined the Progressive Reform Party to form the Progressive Federal Party with Colin Eglin as its leader.

References

Political parties established in 1976
Defunct political parties in South Africa
Defunct liberal political parties
Liberal parties in South Africa
Political parties disestablished in 1977
1975 establishments in South Africa